The Liverpool Institute High School for Boys was an all-boys grammar school in the English port city of Liverpool.

The school had its origins in 1825 but occupied different premises while the money was found to build a dedicated building on Mount Street. The institute was first known as the Liverpool Mechanics' School of Arts. In 1832 the name was shortened to the Liverpool Mechanics' Institution. The façade of the listed building, the entrance hall and modified school hall remain after substantial internal reconstruction was completed in the early 1990s.

School history in brief
Its initial primary purpose as a mechanics' institute (one of many established about this time throughout the country) was to provide educational opportunities, mainly through evening classes, for working men. Lectures for the general public were also provided of wide interest covering topics ranging from Arctic exploration to Shakespeare and philosophy. Luminaries like Charles Dickens, Anthony Trollope and Ralph Waldo Emerson delivered talks and readings in the main lecture hall (now the architecturally restructured Sir Paul McCartney Auditorium of LIPA).

By 1840 the Institution offered evening classes, lectures, a library and a boys' lower and upper school. By the 1850s a formal art school was evolving from the evening classes and in 1856 this diversity was recognised by another name change – The Liverpool Institute and School of Arts.

A girls' school was founded and opened in 1844 under the name Liverpool Institute High School for Girls. It was housed in a merchant's mansion across the street from the boys' school in Blackburne House provided by the generosity of George Holt and which was later (1872) donated to the school by his family in his memory. The school was one of the first which was open to the public in the country established exclusively for the education of girls.

In 1905 the Liverpool City Council took over the management of the secondary schools when the LI Board of Governors presented the school and assets to the City. From then until its closure in 1985, the school was formally known as The Liverpool Institute High School for Boys or more familiarly as The Institute or The Inny to its pupils.

It was an English grammar school for boys ages 11 to 18 with an excellent academic reputation built up over more than a century. Its list of scholarships and places at Oxford and Cambridge runs to some 300 names – in addition to distinctions gained at the University of Liverpool and many other prominent British universities. The school was a true measure of Liverpool's intellectual capital, and its old boys could and can be found in later life in many fields of professional distinction including the law, the Church, armed forces, politics, academia, government and colonial administration as well as in trade and commerce.

In the 1950s, future Beatles Paul McCartney and George Harrison were educated at the school.

Closure of the school

The school was closed by the city council in 1985. The Labour Party nationally opposed grammar schools – see Anthony Crosland's Circular of September 1965 required that Local Authorities bring forward schemes for comprehensive secondary education. As grammar school pupils were selected by examination at age 11, there was a long-standing push towards 'comprehensive schools' (as non-selective schools were known) from that party when it took majority control of the City Council in 1983. Demand for secondary school places in the City had also dropped precipitously and there was a huge oversupply of school space as Liverpool's population contracted during the severe economic recession of the early 1980s.

The Deputy Leader of the Labour (Militant) Group on Council at the time was a former LI schoolboy Derek Hatton who had left without academic distinction in 1964 and with strong feelings of dislike towards the school. However the man who was Chair of the Educational Committee at the time of the decision to close the school was Dominic Brady, whose qualifications for his position amounted to being a former school caretaker.

After closure, the building stood empty and neglected, the roof leaking and the walls crumbling. In 1987 it was announced that the LI Trust (under control of Liverpool Council's Education Department) would grant use of the building and site to a new educational establishment. Paul McCartney had returned to his old school in 1979, when with the band Wings he had played a concert at the Royal Court Theatre, Liverpool. After the school's closure in 1985, McCartney returned one night to reminisce about his school days, while he was writing his 'Liverpool Oratorio'. This visit is captured in 'Echoes'; a DVD which accompanies the Liverpool Oratoria box set. McCartney was determined to save the building somehow and during a conversation with Sir George Martin, the idea of a 'fame school' emerged as Martin was helping Mark Featherstone-Witty start a London secondary school with an innovative curriculum. McCartney and Featherstone-Witty joined forces to create the Liverpool Institute for Performing Arts (LIPA) opening in 1996. The new company took over the Liverpool Institute Trust which had its origins in 1905.

The building was rebuilt (entirely in parts) behind its old façade and re-opened in 1996 under LIPA's name. The new institute is affiliated with Liverpool John Moores University and is no longer a Liverpool secondary school.

Art school

The city's Art College had its origins as part of the Liverpool Institute. In 1883 a new building housing the School of Art was opened around the corner on Hope Street, adjacent to the principal building housing the High School on Mount Street. The Art College by which it was later known, took in talented students often without formal academic credentials (e.g. John Lennon) and the college eventually became one of the four constituent parts of the Liverpool Polytechnic in 1970 and later in 1992 Liverpool John Moores University (LJMU) with the School of Art and Design being housed in the Art and Design Academy.

Liverpool Institute and music

Music and musical performances were a constant theme throughout the life of the school and the Mount St. building. Annual school Speech Day concerts (held in the fine acoustics of Philharmonic Hall, Liverpool), choirs, the organ, piano, music classes and the singing of daily devotional hymns have echoed around its walls for 170 years and continue to do so at LIPA:

Neil Aspinall, 1954–1959: Beatles' road manager, managing director of Apple Corp
Les Chadwick, 1954–1959: member of Gerry & The Pacemakers
Albert Coates, 1894–1900: Anglo-Russian conductor and composer
Lauri de Frece, 1893–1898, singer in musical theatre and actor
Len Garry, 1954–1959: member of The Quarrymen
George Harrison, 1954–1959: musician and one of The Beatles. Left without formal qualifications in July 1959 for a job as an assistant electrician at Blacklers department store
Stan Kelly-Bootle 1941–1947: mathematics scholar, folk singer and composer.
John McCabe, 1950 to 1957: prolific classical music composer
Sir Paul McCartney, 1953–1960: musician. Having taken O and A levels, and deciding not to apply for teachers' training college, in July 1960 left school for the Beatles' first stay in Hamburg.
Peter Sissons 1953–1961, head boy. Presenter of the BBC Nine O'Clock News and BBC Ten O'Clock News between 1993 and 2003, and a newscaster for ITN, on ITV and Channel 4. He was also a former presenter of the BBC's Question Time programme, retiring from the BBC in 2009.
Mike McCartney, 1955–1961: musician Mike McGear in The Scaffold
Sir Charles Santley, British baritone
Ivan Vaughan, a classics sixth former, 1953 to 1960, who introduced Paul McCartney to John Lennon.
C.W. (Colin) Manley, 1953 to 1959 and D.M. (Don) Andrew, 1953 to 1959 both became part of The Remo Four, a group later managed by Brian Epstein.

Notable former pupils

Headmasters

19th century
 Mr. Robert Landers (University of Edinburgh), 1828–31, Headmaster, 1835–36; died in May 1836.
 Mr. Alexander Sinclair MacIlveen Teacher, 1840–42, then Head of Commercial School (1842–1854), then Head of the Liverpool Mechanics' Institute.
 Dr. William Hunter, M.A., LL.D. (Glasgow)- Head of High School of the Liverpool Mechanics' Institute, 1842–45.
 Dr. William Ballantyne Hodgson, L.L.D. (Glasgow) – Head master, 1845–47. Left for Chorlton High School, Manchester, 1847–48. Later Prof. Economic Science, University of Edinburgh, 1871–80.
 Mr. (Later Rev.) James England, M.A. (Dublin, Trinity College) – Headmaster, Liverpool Mechanics' Institute, 1847–49.
 Dr. William Ihne, PhD. (former Prof. Royal Protestant Gymnasium, Elberfeld, Rhenish Prussia) English, Classics – Headmaster, Liverpool Mechanics Institute, 1849–54.
 Mr. Alexander Sinclair MacIlveen, Teacher, 1840–42, then Head of Commercial School (1842–1854), then – Head of the reunited School, 1854 to death in October 1861.
 The Venerable Joshua Jones (later Hughes-Games), M.A., D.C.L. (Oxford, Lincoln College). Mathematics. – Head 1862 to 1865. (Born in 1831, died 1904.)
 Rev.John Sephton, M.A. (“Late Fellow of St. John's College, Cambridge”) ( 02.1866–1889 Headmaster. Born 1836; died in 1915. Reader in Icelandic, University of Liverpool, 1895–1910.
 Mr. Alfred Hughes, M.A., (Oxford, Corpus Christi College). Mathematics. Headmaster, 1890 to 1896. Later Registrar, University of Manchester (born in 1860, married Hester, daughter of Alfred Booth; died 1940.
 Mr. William Charles Fletcher M.A. (Cambridge, St. John's College) CB (1896–1904) – Headmaster of the reunited school, President from 1939 to 1945 of the Mathematical Association, died in 1959

20th century
 Henry Victor Weisse (name changed to Henry Victor Whitehouse in 1917), B.A. (Open Exhibitioner, Oxford, Christ Church) (1904–1923) – Headmaster. Died in July 1936.
 Frederick W. H. Groom, M.A. (Cambridge, St. John's College, Jesus College?) (1894–1917) Vice-Principal (1917–1932 ret.) Acting Headmaster 1923–24. Died in Jan. 1956.
 Rev Henry Herbert Symonds, M.A. (Oxford, Oriel College) – Headmaster (1924–1935). Author of Walking in the Lake District, 1933; Afforestation in the Lake District. Born in 1885 – Died 28 December 1958.
 John Robert Edwards MA (Oxford, University College) Headmaster (1935–1961) born in 1897 at Rhyl; died on 8 January 1992 at the age of 95.
 Malcolm Pasco Smith, M.A. (Cambridge, Trinity) Head master (1961–1965)
 Dennis Booth, B.A. (Liverpool) (1942–1972) Vice Principal (1957–1965); Head master (1965–1972 ret.).
 J. Gareth Rogers, M.A., B.Litt. (Oxford, Jesus College) (1950–1977; – Vice-Principal, 1965–1972; – Head master (1972 -1977 died).
 Bertram (Bert) L. Parker, BSc (Wales, Aberystwyth) (January 1948 – 1982; Head master, 1978–1982 ret.).
 Maurice Devereux, B.A. (Liverpool) (1953–1983; Head master, 1982–1983 ret.).

References

External links
 Liobians.org
 Liverpool Institute for the Performing Arts (LIPA)

Boys' schools in Merseyside
Grade II listed buildings in Liverpool
History of Liverpool
Educational institutions established in 1825
Defunct grammar schools in England
Grade II listed educational buildings
Educational institutions disestablished in 1985
1825 establishments in England
Defunct schools in Liverpool
1985 disestablishments in England
Holt family